Bohumiljania is a genus of leaf beetles in the subfamily Spilopyrinae. It is endemic to New Caledonia. It is named after Czech entomologist Bohumila Špringlová (wife of Jan Bechyně).

Species
 Bohumiljania aoupinie Reid & Beatson, 2011
 Bohumiljania caledonica (Jolivet, 1957)
 Bohumiljania humboldti Jolivet, Verma & Mille, 2005
 Bohumiljania lafoa Reid & Beatson, 2011
 Bohumiljania mandjelia Reid & Beatson, 2011
 Bohumiljania tango Reid & Beatson, 2011
 Bohumiljania xanthogramma Reid & Beatson, 2011
 Bohumiljania xaracuu Reid & Beatson, 2011
 Bohumiljania yuaga Reid & Beatson, 2011

References

Chrysomelidae genera
Insects of New Caledonia